The Tornado outbreak of April 2–3, 1999 was a series of tornado touchdowns that occurred on April 2–3, 1999 from Kansas to Louisiana. The most powerful tornado occurred in Caddo Parish and Bossier Parish in northwestern Louisiana, where an F4 tornado killed 7 people and injured 107 others. Damages from the outbreak were estimated to be near $13.7 million (2006 USD). A total of 17 tornadoes were confirmed across the southern Great Plains during the two-day event.

Tornado event

The first series of tornadoes touched down on April 2 across Oklahoma causing mostly minor damage to some structures.

The strongest tornadoes of the outbreak took place across the Arklatex region during the afternoon hours, where the strongest and lone killer tornado of the outbreak took place. At 3:52 PM, a supercell thunderstorm spawned a tornado over Cross Lake, north of Shreveport Regional Airport. The tornado moved northeast. In Caddo Parish the tornado damaged 66 buildings. In Caddo Parish, damages were estimated at nearly $1.6 million (2006 dollars). At 4:01 PM, the tornado entered Bossier Parish as an F4 tornado. In Bossier Parish, 227 buildings suffered major damage or were destroyed. An additional 162 buildings were damaged. Damages in Bossier Parish are estimated at near $6.7 million (2006 dollars). The tornado dissipated about eight miles northeast of Benton. In all, 7 people were killed and 102 were injured. The tornado was on the ground for about 20 miles. It reached a maximum width of 200 yards. It was Louisiana's deadliest tornado since February 21, 1971, when 10 people were killed east of Delhi.

Three additional tornadoes touched down beside the Caddo-Bossier Parish tornado. These tornadoes injured 1 person and caused up to $6.6 million in damages. Heavy damage was reported near Logansport, Summerfield and Athens heavily damaging several residences.

Weaker tornadoes (rated either F0 or F1) touched down across most of central and northern Arkansas into Missouri as well as in eastern Texas. 4 people in total were injured in two separate tornadoes near Ben and Mammoth Spring with isolated damage to some structures and also to trees and power lines. The outbreak ended just before 6 PM on April 3.

Confirmed tornadoes

April 2 event

April 3 event

See also
List of North American tornadoes and tornado outbreaks

References

External links
 National Climate Data Center Storm Events Search
 National Weather Service Weather Forecast Office in Shreveport, LA

F4 tornadoes by date
Tornadoes of 1999
Tornadoes in Arkansas
Tornadoes in Kansas
Tornadoes in Louisiana
Tornadoes in Missouri
Tornadoes in Oklahoma
Tornadoes in Texas
1999 in Arkansas
1999 in Louisiana
1999 in Texas
1999 natural disasters in the United States
Tornado outbreak